Hisasue Dam is an earthfill dam located in Fukuoka Prefecture in Japan. The dam is used for water supply. The catchment area of the dam is 21.8 km2. The dam impounds about 15  ha of land when full and can store 699 thousand cubic meters of water. The construction of the dam was started on 1977 and completed in 1980.

References

Dams in Fukuoka Prefecture
1980 establishments in Japan